Sarah Osvath (born 25 July 1963) is an Australian fencer. She competed in the women's épée event at the 1996 Summer Olympics.

Having retired from international fencing in 2001, Osvath now works as a research assistant at the University of Technology Sydney's ithree Institute.

References

External links
 

1963 births
Living people
Australian female épée fencers
Olympic fencers of Australia
Fencers at the 1996 Summer Olympics
Sportspeople from Lower Hutt